Philometra sphyraenae is a species of parasitic nematode of fishes, infecting the gonads of marine perciform fishes off the eastern Indian coast. It was first found in the pickhandle barracuda, Sphyraena jello. It is distinguished from its cogenerates by the gubernaculum structure in males, as well as the shape and structure of the females' cephalic and caudal ends, and their oesophagus.

References

Further reading
Selvakumar, Periyasamy, Alagarsamy Sakthivel, and Ayyaru Gopalakrishnan. "Journal of Coastal Life Medicine." Journal of Coastal Life Medicine 3.4 (2015): 290-294.
Moravec, Frantisek, and Isaure de Buron. "A synthesis of our current knowledge of philometrid nematodes, a group of increasingly important fish parasites." Folia Parasitologica 60.2 (2013): 81.

External links
WORMS

Camallanida
Parasitic nematodes of fish
Fauna of India
Nematodes described in 2013